Llewelyn Griffiths  (born 1877) was a Welsh international footballer. He was part of the Wales national football team, playing 1 match on 15 March 1902 against Scotland.

At club level, he played for Wrexham in the 1900s.

See also
 List of Wales international footballers (alphabetical)

References

1877 births
1943 deaths
People from Ruabon
Sportspeople from Wrexham County Borough
Welsh footballers
Wales international footballers
Wrexham A.F.C. players
Association footballers not categorized by position